Annie Zaidi is a Pakistani actress. She is known for her roles in dramas Dulhan, Bin Roye, Alif Allah Aur Insaan and Fitoor.

Early life
She was born in 1963 on 12 September in Karachi, Pakistan. She completed her studies from University of Karachi.

Career
She made her debut as an actress on PTV in 1984. She appeared in drama Chhaon. She was noted for her roles in dramas Mohabat Subh Ka Sitara Hai, Aahista Aahista, Mausam, Zoya Sawleha, Manchahi and Bin Roye, Dil Banjaara. She also appeared in dramas Gustakh Ishq, Alif Allah Aur Insaan, Amanat, Tabeer and Ki Jaana Main Kaun, Yaqeen Ka Safar. Since then she appeared in dramas Uraan, Tawaan, Muqaddar, Dunk and Fitoor. In 2020 She appeared in film House No. 242 with Sonya Hussyn and Hira Tareen.

Personal life
Annie was married and in 2005 her husband died. She has three children a son named Ali Zaidi and a daughter named Maheen Zaidi.

Filmography

Television

Web series

Telefilm

Film

References

External links
 
 

1963 births
Living people
20th-century Pakistani actresses
Pakistani television actresses
21st-century Pakistani actresses
Pakistani film actresses